On December 28, 1997, United Airlines Flight 826 was operated by a Boeing 747-100 flying from New Tokyo Airport (which changed its name to Narita International Airport in 2004), Japan to Honolulu International Airport, Hawaii. The plane turned around and landed safely back in Tokyo, but one passenger, a 32-year-old Japanese woman, died.

Flight details
Flight 826 was piloted by an experienced cockpit crew. The captain had around 15,000 flight hours, including 1,100 hours on the Boeing 747. The first officer had around 10,000 hours, including 1,500 hours on the Boeing 747, and the flight engineer had around 3,500 hours of flight time, including 850 hours in the Boeing 747. The cabin crew ranged from 8 to 34 years in seniority.

Flight 826 departed Tokyo's Narita airport on December 28, 1997, at 20:30 local time. It reached a cruising altitude of  just under a half-hour later. The captain chose the only authorized route at the time in which severe turbulence or thunderstorms were not forecast to occur.

At cruising altitude, the flight initially encountered enough turbulence for the captain to turn on the "fasten seat belt" sign. Fifteen minutes later, the turbulence subsided and the fasten seatbelt sign was switched off. At the time the captain announced to the passengers that turbulence was still a possibility and that the seat belts should be fastened when seated. A flight attendant made a Japanese announcement that was similar.

About an hour later, after calm conditions, the "fasten seat belt sign" came on again without any announcement. After about two minutes of not very strong turbulence, suddenly the 747 dropped slightly then shot back up and then back down at such a velocity that a purser, who was hanging on to a fixed countertop, found himself hanging upside down holding the countertop with his feet in the air. The airplane then pitched up and steeply climbed before heavily falling again, this occurring when the right wing dropped sharply. After another moderate climb, the flight returned to normal.

After the incident, a Japanese woman who had her belt unfastened was found lying unconscious and bleeding heavily in the aisle. Despite quick resuscitation efforts by injured flight attendants and a passenger doctor, she was soon pronounced dead.

Fifteen passengers and three flight attendants had spine and neck fractures. Another 87 other passengers had bruises, sprains and other minor injuries. While Henderson Field on Midway Atoll was the closest airport, the captain opted to return to Tokyo after assessing the aircraft was still flightworthy and Tokyo had medical facilities judged better to handle the injuries.

Three hours later, the aircraft landed safely at Narita Airport.

NTSB investigation and aftermath

The flight data recorder, as analyzed by the National Transportation Safety Board (NTSB), found that the sensors had initially recorded a peak normal acceleration of 1.814g in the first sharp ascent. Then the data showed that the aircraft had an out of control roll by 18° and then plunged to an extreme negative G of -0.824g.

The NTSB investigation found a potential issue that could have prevented the death and many injuries. Nobody could remember hearing the typical "fasten seat belt" chime when the fasten seat belt light came on about two minutes before the turbulence event and no announcements of the "fasten seat belt" light being on were made in either English or Japanese.

As a result of the incident, United Airlines released a bulletin entitled Turbulence Encounter and Passenger Fatality which went into detail on the events of Flight 826 and emphasized the importance of effective communication. The airline also took measures to enforce its policy of encouraging passengers to keep their seat belts fastened even if the seat belt sign is off.
 
United Airlines had previously intended to sell the aging aircraft to a salvage company in early 1998. After this incident, the airline opted to retire the aircraft soon afterwards with Flight 826 being its last revenue flight.

See also
 TWA Flight 742

References

External links

 

Aviation accidents and incidents in 1997
Accidents and incidents involving the Boeing 747
826
Aviation accidents and incidents in the Pacific Ocean
December 1997 events
1997 disasters in Oceania